Butcher Hill Historic District is a national historic district located near Beverly, Randolph County, West Virginia.  It encompasses one contributing building, one contributing site, and one contributing structure. It consists of the "Butcher Hill" home, a "V"-shaped trench from the American Civil War in front of the house at the edge of a drop, and the Butcher Cemetery.  The house is a two-story frame dwelling, with a hipped roof and rounded turrets in the Queen Anne style.  The property was the site of a major Federal encampment, entrenchment and artillery placement during the Civil War.

It was listed on the National Register of Historic Places in 1989.

References

National Register of Historic Places in Randolph County, West Virginia
Historic districts in Randolph County, West Virginia
Queen Anne architecture in West Virginia
Cemeteries on the National Register of Historic Places in West Virginia
Randolph County, West Virginia in the American Civil War
American Civil War sites in West Virginia
Historic districts on the National Register of Historic Places in West Virginia